Stony Point is a historic home located near Greenwood, Greenwood County, South Carolina. It was built between 1818 and 1829, and is a two-story, five bay, brick dwelling. It has a jerkinhead roof and twin exterior end chimneys.  It was the home of Joel Smith, who was an influential planter, merchant, banker, and supporter of industries and railroads.

It was listed on the National Register of Historic Places in 1975.

References

External links

Historic American Buildings Survey in South Carolina
Houses on the National Register of Historic Places in South Carolina
Houses completed in 1829
National Register of Historic Places in Greenwood County, South Carolina
Houses in Greenwood County, South Carolina
Buildings and structures in Greenwood, South Carolina